Steinbach is a river of Bavaria, Germany.

The Steinbach springs between the two districts Steinbach and Windach of Moorenweis. It is a right tributary of the Paar in Mering.

See also
List of rivers of Bavaria

References

Rivers of Bavaria
Rivers of Germany